The Departmental Council of Val-d'Oise is the deliberative assembly of the Val-d'Oise department in the region of Île-de-France. It consists of 42 members (general councilors) from 21 cantons and its headquarters are in Cergy-Pontoise.

The President of the General Council is Marie-Christine Cavecchi.

Vice-Presidents 
The President of the Departmental Council is assisted by 12 vice-presidents chosen from among the departmental advisers. Each of them has a delegation of authority.

References 

Val-d'Oise
Val-d'Oise